Phoebus Apollo may refer to:

Apollo, a figure in Greek and Roman mythology, god of sun, medicine, music, poetry, and sciences. Apollo's chief epithet was Phoebus, literally "bright".
Parnassius phoebus, a swallowtail butterfly commonly known as the Phoebus Apollo